This is a list of places on the Victorian Heritage Register in the Unincorporated areas in Victoria, Australia. The Victorian Heritage Register is maintained by the Heritage Council of Victoria.

The Victorian Heritage Register, as of 2021, lists the following five state-registered places within the Unincorporated areas:

References 

Unincorporated
+